The Mayor of Casterbridge is a 1978 BBC seven-part serial based on the eponymous 1886 book by the British novelist Thomas Hardy. The six-hour drama was written by television dramatist Dennis Potter and directed by David Giles with Alan Bates as the title character. It was released as a 3-disc DVD box set in May 2003.

Plot
On a drunken impulse, Henchard sells his wife and daughter at a country fair, an outrageous act for which he suffers agonising remorse. Years later, when he has become a respected and prosperous man, his wife returns to find him. Henchard's attempt to right the long-ago wrong sets in motion a series of events that spell his destruction.

Cast
 Alan Bates as Michael Henchard 
 Anne Stallybrass as Susan
 Janet Maw as Elizabeth-Jane 
 Jack Galloway as Farfrae 
 Anna Massey as Lucetta

Location
The series was shot entirely on location in Dorset, largely in the village of Corfe Castle.

References

External links

1978 British television series debuts
1978 British television series endings
1970s British drama television series
BBC television miniseries
1970s British television miniseries
Television shows based on works by Thomas Hardy
English-language television shows
Television shows set in England